David Lloyd Leisure is Europe's largest health, fitness and leisure business by revenue, operating 130 clubs across nine countries.

History
David Lloyd established David Lloyd Leisure in 1982 and opened the first club, aimed at providing a family orientated, high quality fitness and leisure facility. This was somewhat distinct from the traditional gyms and sports centres of the time.  There was also an emphasis on racquet sports.

By 1995, there were 18 David Lloyd Leisure clubs when Whitbread PLC acquired the company for £182 million, incorporating it into its Restaurants & Leisure Division. Gerrard Duxbury remained as managing director of the division until 1996.

Whitbread ran more than 50 David Lloyd Leisure (DLL) clubs in the UK with a further number in Spain, the Netherlands and Belgium. However, by the mid-2000s, the business was giving Whitbread a poor financial return, and on 2 August 2007 they sold it to London & Regional Properties and Bank of Scotland for £925 million. Whitbread used the proceeds from the sale to repay debt.

London & Regional Properties already owned and operated Next Generation Clubs; the businesses were merged under the Next Generation Clubs' management team led by Scott Lloyd, David Lloyd's son.

On 5 September 2013 London & Regional Properties agreed to sell David Lloyd Leisure to TDR Capital for £750m. Since then, David Lloyd Leisure has grown from 90 clubs to 130 through both new build and acquisition of existing clubs and groups. During this period TDR Capital has invested £440m into the existing clubs to ensure that they continue to deliver market leading facilities and services for its members.
The David Lloyd Leisure Group now has 101 clubs in the UK and a further 29 clubs internationally comprising its three brands David Lloyd Clubs, Harbour Clubs in London and David Lloyd Meridian in Germany. 
 
David Lloyd Bicester became DLL's 130th club (and 101st Club in the UK) when it opened in September 2022.
 
Since 2017, David Lloyd Leisure has been voted into the Sunday Times’ 25 Best Companies to work for by its team, for four years.

Current operations
David Lloyd Leisure currently operates 101 clubs in the United Kingdom as well as 29 in Europe in Spain, Germany, France, Switzerland, Ireland, Belgium, Italy and the Netherlands.

References

Tennis venues in the United Kingdom
Health clubs in the United Kingdom
Whitbread former divisions and subsidiaries
Companies established in 1982